The Pōmare dynasty was the reigning family of the Kingdom of Tahiti between the unification of the islands by Pōmare I in 1788 and Pōmare V's cession of the kingdom to France in 1880. Their influence once spanned most of the Society Islands, the Austral Islands and the Tuamotu Archipelago.

The scientific name Pomarea of the Polynesian monarch flycatchers was established in honour of this dynasty. It was first used for the species from Tahiti by René Lesson and Prosper Garnot, and subsequently for the entire genus.

History 

The ancestors of the family ultimately descended from an individual named Tu from the island of Fakarava in the Tuamotus who was adopted as heir by Mauaihiti, Ari'i of Pare. Settling in Tahiti, the dynasty became the district chieftains or ari'i rahi of Porionuʻu (including the smaller districts of Pare and Arue) and intermarried with the Tamatoa family from the island of Raiatea. With foreign weapons, chief Tu gradually took over control of the other parts of the island of Tahiti, and then brought the islands of Moorea, Mehetia, and Tetiaroa into a single entity.

Chief Tu later adopted the name Pōmare. Pō-mare means 'night cougher', a nickname he took, as was common in that time, in honor of his daughter Teriinavahoroa who died from tuberculosis in 1792.

Through subsequent inheritance, adoptions, and marriage alliances, the dynasty at its peak included all the Society Islands with a member of the family ruling in Tahiti, Raiatea and Bora Bora. Tahiti also controlled some of the outlying islands of the Austral Islands and the Tuamotu Archipelago.

Tahiti and its dependencies were made a French protectorate in 1842, and largely annexed as a colony of France in 1880. The monarchy was abolished by France and Tahiti annexed in 1880. The last reigning monarch of the dynasty was Teriimaevarua III, Queen of Bora Bora, who abdicated in 1895.
There are still pretenders and many Tahitians still wish for a return of the monarchy, some of whom claim that the act of abolishing the monarchy was either outright illegal, or outside of certain jurisdictions.

Pōmare Monarchs 

 Pōmare I, Tu Vairaatoa Taina (1791–1803)
 Pōmare II, Tu Tunuieaiteatua (1803–1815)
 Pōmare III, Teriitaria (1821–1827)
 Pōmare IV, Aimata (1827–1877)
 Pōmare V, Teriitaria Teratane (1877–1880)

Current status
Until his death in 2013, Tauatomo Mairau claimed to be the heir to the Tahitian throne, and had attempted to re-assert the status of the monarchy in court. His claims were not recognised by France. On 28 May 2009, Joinville Pomare, an adopted member of the Pomare family, declared himself King Pomare XI, during a ceremony attended by descendants of leading chiefs but spurned by members of his own family. Other members of the family recognise his uncle, Léopold Pomare, as heir to the throne.

Another claimant, Athanase Teiri, claims descent from Pomare V and sovereignty over French Polynesian sea, land, and airspace. He and his associates had received some attention in politics in the Tuamotu beforehand. He and associates assembled 100 people for a declaration of an independent Moorea, and claim to have 50,000 signatures supporting Moorea's independence. (Although Moorea has only 16,000 people, the 50,000 signature figure is not necessarily untrue because it could imply that Hau Pakumotu received signatures from people both on Moorea and in other parts of French Polynesia.) He declared an independent Pakomotu Sovereign Republic State on 25 June 2010 and has called French Polynesia a "mistake". Athanase Teiri was arrested in early June 2010 for illegally issuing ID cards for his republic.
He is currently being held at the Papeete police station for attempted murder of a policeman, armed rebellion, forming of a militia and illegal possession of a weapon. He had previously received a six-month jail sentence for intimidating and threatening senior officials.

Family tree

See also
Kingdom of Tahiti
List of monarchs of Tahiti
List of consorts of Tahiti
Hawaii–Tahiti relations

References

External links 
 The Tahitian Royal Family
 Pomare Dynasty Adoptions

 
French Polynesia-related lists